Skyscraper Mountain is a  summit located in Mount Rainier National Park in Pierce County of Washington state. It is part of the Cascade Range. Skyscraper Mountain is situated northwest of the Sunrise Historic District, from which a four-mile hike leads to the mountain, mostly on the Wonderland Trail. However, the trail does not reach the summit, but it is still a walk up to the top from Skyscraper Pass. The summit provides views of Burroughs Mountain, Sluiskin Mountain, and Mount Rainier. Mount Fremont is its nearest higher peak,  to the east. Access is limited by snowpack closing the Sunrise Road much of the year. July, August, and September are typically the months when the Sunrise Road is seasonally open for vehicle traffic. Precipitation runoff from Skyscraper Mountain drains into tributaries of the White River.

History
The descriptive name Skyscraper Mountain came from its supposed resemblance to a modern style of architecture according to Edmond S. Meany.  The name was officially adopted in 1932 by the United States Board on Geographic Names.

Climate

Skyscraper Mountain is located in the marine west coast climate zone of western North America. Most weather fronts originate in the Pacific Ocean, and travel northeast toward the Cascade Mountains. As fronts approach, they are forced upward by the peaks of the Cascade Range (Orographic lift), causing them to drop their moisture in the form of rain or snowfall onto the Cascades. As a result, the west side of the Cascades experiences high precipitation, especially during the winter months in the form of snowfall. During winter months, weather is usually cloudy, but, due to high pressure systems over the Pacific Ocean that intensify during summer months, there is often little or no cloud cover during the summer.

See also

 Geography of Washington (state)
 Geology of the Pacific Northwest

References

External links
 National Park Service web site: Mount Rainier National Park
 Skyscraper Mountain weather: Mountain Forecast

Cascade Range
Mountains of Pierce County, Washington
Mountains of Washington (state)
Mount Rainier National Park
North American 2000 m summits